Nitsch is a German language surname that stems from a reduced form of the male given name Nicholas. It may refer to:
Herbert Nitsch (1970), Austrian freediver
Hermann Nitsch (1938–2022), Austrian avant-garde artist
Jennifer Nitsch (1966–2004), German television actress
Leopold Nitsch (1897–1977), Austrian footballer and coach
Fritz Heinisch (1900–1983),  American football end
Robert Nitsch, British Army general

References 

German-language surnames
Surnames from given names